Rodrigo De Lazzari (born 10 December 1980) is a Brazilian footballer of Italian descent who plays for Noroeste.

Biography
In January 2003, he was signed by C.D. Operário from Associação Atlética Batel.

On 31 August 2007, he was signed by A.C. Siena along with Vanderson Scardovelli. They left for Martina on loan on 31 January 2008.

In February 2009 he joined Colligiana

After without a club in June 2009, he joined Itumbiara in December. In July 2010 he was re-signed by Operário Ferrovário.

In December 2010 he left for Chapecoense.

Honours
Campeonato Paranaense: 2007

References

External links
Brazilian FA Database 

1980 births
Living people
Brazilian footballers
Brazilian expatriate footballers
Expatriate footballers in Italy
A.C.N. Siena 1904 players
A.S.D. Olimpia Colligiana players
Association football defenders
Footballers from Curitiba
A.S.D. Martina Calcio 1947 players
Esporte Clube Noroeste players